James C. Mathis III (born November 28, 1974) is an American voice, film and television actor best known for voicing Black Panther in various media.

Career 
Mathis was born in Brooklyn, New York City. After nine years since he starred in his first feature film Breakin' the Rules Mathis went on to make many guest appearances in television shows like ER, Guys Like Us, Pacific Blue and City of Angels.

His first main role was the character Bruce in the VH1 show I Hate My 30's.

Mathis started voice over providing the English voice of Sigint in the English version of the video game Metal Gear Solid 3: Snake Eater which is also one of his most notable roles. He voiced X and the Beast in Shadows of the Damned.

Filmography

Film

Television

Video games

References

External links 

 
 James C. Mathis III at VoiceChasers.com
 

Living people
African-American male actors
American male film actors
American male television actors
American male video game actors
American male voice actors
20th-century American male actors
21st-century American male actors
20th-century African-American people
21st-century African-American people
People from Brooklyn
1974 births